Devolution: A Firsthand Account of the Rainier Sasquatch Massacre is a fiction book by American author Max Brooks set in the Pacific Northwest. It chronicles the story of a small, isolated community of technologically-dependent city dwellers who suddenly are cut off from the rest of the world after a volcanic eruption. In addition to lacking outdoor survival skills and resources, they find themselves also trying to survive attacks by Sasquatch. The book was optioned by Legendary Entertainment to become a film, around the same time the book began to be sold to the public in June 2020.

Plot

Thirteen months after the devastating eruption of Mt. Rainier in Washington State, a reporter receives an email from a man named Frank McCray who claims that the legendary Bigfoot wiped out a nearby town named Greenloop. Frank’s sister Kate Holland, one of the residents of Greenloop, has been missing since the eruption, leaving behind only a journal describing the events of the massacre. The narrative follows Kate's journal entries and interviews with Frank and National Park Service Ranger Josephine Schell, interspersed with research on Bigfoot and news reports prior to and after the Mt. Rainier eruption.
The journal entries begin as Kate and her husband Dan arrive at the town. Greenloop is a small eco-centric community, the brainchild of tech mogul Tony Durant. Powered by solar panels and biofuel generators, Greenloop is designed to be the perfect community for the Green Revolution, removed from crowded cities yet still connected to modern conveniences. The community is ninety minutes from Seattle, with only one access road, completely out of cellular tower range. The residents depend completely on drone deliveries for food and supplies, and the only means of receiving wi-fi or a cellular signal is a single fiber-optic cable.

Kate’s journal is initially a record kept to help manage her anxiety and OCD, addressed to her therapist. As Kate settles into the community, she describes her troubled relationship with Dan and the other residents of Greenloop; the retired Vincent and Bobbi Boothe, author and professor Alex Reinhardt, psychologists Carmen and Effie Perkins-Foster, their daughter Palomino, and artist Mostar. Tony Durant and his wife, former model Yvette, also live in the town. The community lives in an uneasy peace, which is seemingly made worse by the blunt attitude of Mostar. 

Upon the eruption of Mt. Rainier, Tony decides that the residents should shelter in place and wait for rescuers to arrive, relying on the solar and biofuel capabilities of their homes to see them through the crisis. Mostar argues for the community to begin rationing supplies and other steps to increase their chances of survival, but the other residents dismiss her concerns. Mostar pressures Kate and Dan into helping her prepare, displaying an unusually high degree of survival skills. Kate and Dan’s relationship slowly improves as Mostar encourages him to learn new skills. 

Still unable to contact anyone outside the town, the residents grow increasingly worried as the crisis worsens. The cities and towns closest to Mt. Rainier, reaching all the way to Tacoma, are hit hard by the eruption, and civil unrest begins to overwhelm Seattle. As the National Guard and local officials try to regain control of the crisis, tensions in Greenloop grow worse as the town’s food supplies dwindle.
As the other residents begin to panic and turn on each other, Kate begins to find signs of an unusual animal in the area. While out for a hike, she sees something large moving in the trees, which chases her back to the town. Over the next few days, more signs of the creatures appear, culminating in Kate seeing what she describes as “Bigfoot.” Initially, the other residents refuse to believe her, claiming the creature is a bear. However, one night all the residents are awoken by several massive, ape-like creatures tearing open the town’s compost bins and agree that they are dealing with the legendary Sasquatch. Believing the creatures to merely be curious animals, Vincent attempts to communicate with them, but this only prompts the Sasquatches to attack the town by throwing rocks. 

The next day, Vincent decides to try and hike out to call for help, despite Mostar’s warnings against  this. That night, the residents hear Vincent screaming in pain in the forest, which Mostar recognizes as a trap set by the Sasquatches to draw them out. Overcome by survivor’s guilt, Kate and Dan go to investigate and discover the Sasquatches camp, where they find that Vincent has been eaten by the creatures. They are ambushed by the Sasquatches, but Mostar saves them by threatening the creatures with fire. Mostar rallies the town to prepare defenses and weapons, but before they are finished, the Sasquatches attack the town. Reinhardt, Tony, and Yvette are killed in the initial assault, and Kate is pursued by the leader of the troop, whom she calls Alpha. Alpha corners Kate in her house, but Kate manages to burn Alpha badly. Mostar kills one of the Sasquatches, but dies in the process. Kate learns that Mostar grew up during the Bosnian war and the siege of Sarajevo, where she learned her survival skills. With Kate now leading them, the remaining residents prepare for a last stand. The Sasquatches attack, and though the residents kill most of the creatures, including the Alpha, all the residents except Kate and Palomino are killed. 

A week later, a team of Park Rangers led by Schell arrive at the town. Kate and Palomino are gone, but the searchers discover the Sasquatch corpses. Thirteen months later, Frank is still searching the area around Greenloop, but Kate and Palomino’s fate is unknown. Frank believes that the massacre triggered a primal desire in Kate to hunt any Sasquatches she can find.

Reactions

Kirkus Reviews was positive, calling the book "a tasty, if not always tasteful, tale of supernatural mayhem". Publishers Weekly and Library Journal also had positive reviews, saying Brooks "packs his plot with action, information, and atmosphere, and captures both the foibles and the heroism of his characters", and that it was a "creative and well-executed conceit" that would also appeal to "those who appreciate nonfiction survival stories". The Washington Post was negative, with the review titled "A great Bigfoot novel may be lurking out there. Max Brooks's 'Devolution' isn't it." USA Today gave it a mixed review, saying it was "ambitious mishmash of individually interesting pieces. Not quite sharp enough for compelling satire, a little too sneering for effective horror, it will find plenty of readers among devotees of Brooks, but will be a miss for most general readers." American gun enthusiast and self-defense instructor Massad Ayoob reviewed the book, concluding that it presented a good case for firearms ownership.

References

Further reading
 
 

American books
Mount Rainier in fiction
Novels set in Washington (state)
Bigfoot in popular culture
Books about the COVID-19 pandemic
Survival fiction
2020 science fiction novels
2020s horror novels
Del Rey books